Alcohol Funnycar was an American rock band from Seattle, Washington.

The band was formed in 1991 by Ben London, an Ohio native, in Seattle. Bassist Tommy "Bonehead" Simpson was a former member of Love Battery and Crisis Party. Joel Trueblood was a former member of The Untamed Youth and went on to play with Neko Case. The band released an EP and two full-lengths in the mid-1990s before disbanding.

Members
Ben London - vocals, guitar
Tommy "Bonehead" Simpson - bass
Buzz Crocker - drums (1991-1993)
Joel Trueblood - drums (1993-1996)

Discography
Burn EP (C/Z Records, 1993)
Time to Make the Donuts (C/Z Records, 1993)
Weasels (C/Z Records, 1995)

References

Musical groups from Seattle
Rock music groups from Washington (state)
C/Z Records artists